Nimmo is a 1984 Punjabi film, directed by Veerendra, starring Veerendra, Priti Sapru, Mohan Singh Baggad, Mehar Mittal with Daljit Kaur's guest appearance and more. Kamal Kant Mishra composed the music.

Music

Title song sang by Channi Singh of Alaap, and the rest of the songs were penned by Bhulla Ram Chann (Chann Goraya Wala), Blram Mast, Sikander Bharti, S.S Azad and Salma Agha.

1 Ek Too Hover Ek Main-
Salma Agha, Suresh Wadkar

2 Balle Balle-
Mahendra Kapoor, Anuradha Paudwal

3 Gal Sun Ve Thanderara-
Mahendra Kapoor, Anuradha Paudwal

4 Sassi Nal Bair Ku Kamaya-
Anuradha Paudwal

5 Yaad Karegi Payar Nu Mere-
Suresh Wadkar

6 Chamka Ne Pendiyan-
Salma Agha

7 Joo Joo Tere Bhagat-
Prof. Darshan Singh Ji Khalsa

8 Chhota Devra Bhabhi-
Salma Agha, Veerendra Katyal

9 Hee Aakhadi-
Veerendra Katyal(Veerendra (Katyal) surname uas as singer)

References

External links 

Films set in Punjab, India
1984 films
Punjabi-language Indian films
1980s Punjabi-language films